O2 is the sixth studio album of the rock band FireHouse. It was released in 2000 and it is the only album to feature the late Bruce Waibel on bass.

Track listing
All songs written by Leverty and Snare.
 "Jumpin'" - 3:44
 "Take It Off" - 3:51
 "The Dark" - 4:36
 "Don't Fade On Me" - 4:47
 "I'd Rather Be Making Love" - 3:59
 "What You Can Do" - 3:36
 "I'm In Love This Time" - 3:45
 "Unbelievable" - 4:13
 "Loving You Is Paradise" - 4:29
 "Call Of The Night" - 4:21

Personnel
C.J. Snare - vocals, keyboards
Bill Leverty - guitars, vocals on Track 7
Michael Foster - drums
Bruce Waibel - bass guitar

References

2000 albums
FireHouse (band) albums
Pony Canyon albums
Spitfire Records albums